This is a list of listed buildings in Næstved Municipality, Denmark.

The list

4160 Herlufmagle

4171 Glumsø

4250 Fuglebjerg

4262 Sandved

4684 Holmegaard

4700 Næstved

4733 Tappernøje

4736 Karrebæksminde

References

External links

 Danish Agency of Culture

 
Næstved